Hollow Man 2 is a 2006 American science fiction horror film directed by Claudio Fäh and starring Peter Facinelli, Laura Regan and Christian Slater. In the film, a government experiment goes wrong, leaving soldier Michael Griffin (Slater) permanently invisible. When his health starts to deteriorate, he goes after the scientists who ruined his life. It is the stand-alone sequel to the 2000 film Hollow Man, released direct-to-video on May 23, 2006.

Plot
At a cocktail party at the Reisner Institute, a Washington think tank, an invisible force drags a scientist named Devin into a nearby bathroom, where the force (implied to be a person) brutally throws Devin around for information. Devin mentions another scientist, Maggie Dalton, who knows the "formula" the invisible person is looking for. Apparently accepting this, the man releases him, warning him not to divulge information about this incident to anybody. As soon as the invisible man leaves (or rather, pretends to leave),  Devin attempts to call someone on his cell phone, but the invisible man smashes the phone and slashes Devin's throat. The police arrive at the laboratory to conduct a murder investigation, but the laboratory's military supervisor, Colonel Gavin Bishop, insists it is an internal military incident and the police have no jurisdiction. Fearing attacks on the remaining scientists, the lab's owner, Dr. William Reisner, employs Frank Turner and his partner, Detective Lisa Martinez, to protect Maggie, but refuses to divulge any information on the nature of his work.

The two detectives stand guard outside Maggie's house. When Lisa opens the door to let the cat in, the invisible man sneaks past her into the house. Just as he reaches the study where Maggie is, Lisa tracks him down, and he strangles her with a lamp's power cord. Suddenly, armed military commandos appear and storm the house, using thermal goggles to target and corner the invisible man. Outside, Turner confronts Bishop, realizing that they used him and Lisa to lure the invisible man to the house. Several stun grenades go off around the house, incapacitating the soldiers and allowing the invisible man to escape in pursuit of Turner and Maggie. He almost catches up to them, but is struck and badly injured by a car, and flees.

Maggie is taken into protective custody by the police, where Turner's superior and friend, Captain Tom Harrison, has received orders to have her transferred to military custody. Frank helps Maggie escape from the police station and they flee in a stolen car. Bishop and Reisner, knowing their careers would end if Maggie talks, declare them fugitives.

Maggie later tells Turner that five years prior, a team of scientists figured out how to make humans invisible, but something went wrong, leaving only two survivors. A year after the original project was scrapped, the Reisner Institute restarted the experiments as a covertly Department of Defense-funded operation to create the perfect soldier, codenamed "Silent Knight", which attempts to render humans invisible. The resulting serum does turn human tissue invisible, but with adverse effects: as it allows light to pass directly through the subject, the radiation damages the cells and causes physical and mental degradation, slowly killing the person. Maggie developed a compound called the "Buffer" to counteract the effects of that particular radiation. A soldier named Michael Griffin volunteered, and the serum succeeded, but the Buffer failed and Griffin seemingly died, which in turn got Maggie fired. Maggie believes that Griffin faked his death so he could use his powers without restraint, but now needs the antidote to the radiation before he dies.

Maggie receives a message from a man named Ludlow, who has been in contact with her for weeks. Turner uses his contacts to find Ludlow, a soldier enlisted into the program after Sebastian Caine (the original guinea pig), but before Griffin. He had gone into hiding, but is now slowly dying from radiation. Ludlow has also been tracking Griffin, and reveals the true story to his supposed "death" and the program itself: Operation Silent Knight was never about national security, and neither was Griffin given the Buffer, since the Department used him to assassinate their political enemies.

Meanwhile, Griffin infiltrates Bishop's office and both get into a fight. The latter attempts to reason with him and then, getting desperate, stabs him, but does not kill him, with a pen. Griffin impales Bishop with the same pen, and uses his computer to locate Ludlow. Arriving at the hideout, Griffin attacks Turner, but Ludlow intervenes, sacrificing himself to allow Turner and Maggie to escape. Griffin decides to make them return by capturing Maggie's sister. When they meet at the train station where he is hiding, Griffin silently catches Maggie and tries to turn her invisible so he can take her unnoticed, but Turner intervenes. After a short fight, Griffin escapes with Maggie, leaving Turner with the arriving Reisner and his guards. A short time later, Reisner pursues an invisible man, but is soon captured and held by him. Believing him to be Griffin, he offers to send for the Buffer. The figure, however, is Turner, who used Griffin's discarded syringe to become invisible as well. Reisner, backing away, is hit and killed by a speeding car.

Griffin takes Maggie to her old college laboratory to create the Buffer for him. Griffin forces her to inject herself with it first, then injects himself with another dose. With his survival seemingly assured, Griffin tries to kill Maggie, but Turner (now invisible) intervenes and knocks him out of the laboratory window. Turner runs outside, where Griffin renders him unconscious. As Griffin slowly turns visible, Maggie reveals that both of them have been poisoned, as the vial contained rat poison; she loses consciousness. Enraged, Griffin takes a shovel and attempts to kill her, but Turner, having recovered, stops him and impales him with the shovel. He then carries Maggie away for medical attention, leaving Griffin's body outside in the rain.

A few days later, Maggie is recovering in hospital and is poised to be released. Heather tells her that Turner has not been found. Maggie insists that he will come back to her, as she knows that he needs her. Outside, they are being watched by a hooded invisible man, presumably Turner, who then walks away.

Cast

Release
The film was released direct-to-video on May 23, 2006. Along with the film, the DVD also included the "Inside Hollow Man 2" featurette, a visual effects featurette and storyboards.
In 2013 Mill Creek Entertainment released the film for the first time on Blu-ray in a 2 pack set along with the original Hollow Man; all extras were dropped for the Blu-ray release.

Reception
Hollow Man 2, as a direct-to-video release, had lower expectations than its preceding film.

References

External links

2006 direct-to-video films
2006 films
American science fiction horror films
2000s science fiction horror films
Direct-to-video sequel films
Films shot in Vancouver
Films about invisibility
Films directed by Claudio Fäh
Films with screenplays by Joel Soisson
Destination Films films
Sony Pictures direct-to-video films
2000s English-language films
2000s monster movies
2000s American films